The 1935 Colorado Buffaloes football team was an American football team that represented the University of Colorado as a member of the Rocky Mountain Conference (RMC) during the 1935 college football season. In its first season under head coach Bunny Oakes, the team compiled an overall record of 5–4 record with a mark of 5–1 against conference opponents, shared RMC title with Utah State, and outscored all opponents by a total of 140 to 47.

Quarterback Kayo Lam led the team with 1,043 rushing yards and 286 passing yards. Lam was also the team's punter and punter.  He averaged 40.2 yards on 32 punts and 19.4 yard on 25 returns. On October 19, 1935, Lam rushed 226 yards and four touchdowns on only seven carries for a school record 32.29 yards per carry.

Schedule

References

Colorado
Colorado Buffaloes football seasons
Rocky Mountain Athletic Conference football champion seasons
Colorado Buffaloes football